The Dewoitine D.480 was a French single engine side-by-side sports and training aircraft built in the early 1930s. Two were completed and flew with several different radial engines. One remained active through the 1950s.

Design

The D.480 was designed to a government programme for a side-by-side trainer for flying schools.  It was of mixed construction, with a wooden wing and metal fuselage.  Its one-piece cantilever low wing was trapezoidal out to elliptical tips, tapered strongly in thickness from root to tip and had significant dihedral.  The wing was built around a single spruce and plywood spar and entirely ply skinned.  High aspect ratio ailerons filled over half the trailing edges, with ground-adjustable trimming flaps near the roots.

The metal-skinned fuselage was based on four longerons, giving it a slightly rounded square cross-section. It was always intended that the D.48 series should be able to accommodate a variety of radial engines in the  range and the first prototype, type D.480, had a  Salmson 7Ac seven cylinder engine in the nose, enclosed in a cowling which exposed its cylinder heads for cooling. A second example, designated D.481, was built at the same time as the first and was identical apart from its  Lorraine 5Pa radial, similarly cowled. Pilot and pupil sat side by side with dual controls in an open cockpit close to the wing leading edge.  Behind them the fuselage tapered to a convention tail.  The horizontal tail was roughly elliptical in plan and mounted on top of the fuselage, far enough forward to need only a small space between the elevators for rudder movement. Its deep, full rudder was hinged on a blunted triangular fin.

Each mainwheel was mounted on a stub axle at the vertex of a V-strut hinged on the lower fuselage longeron, with a near-vertical sprung leg, with an oleo strut shock absorber, to the wing spar. The tailwheel was on a long, hinged leg close to the rear fuselage with a short, vertical shock absorber.

Development

Both examples had official pre-flight structural checks made in January 1932; the D.481 at least flew that same month. They were registered as F-AKFF and F-AKFG.  One of the pair was displayed at the December 1932 Paris Aero Salon after receiving a  Salmson 9NC nine-cylinder radial, housed under a long-chord, NACA-style  cowling. The type number of this variant is not known for certain but recreated French civil aircraft registers show that both spent part of the lives as D.482s.

The register also indicates that one flew for a time as a military aircraft; Dewoitine had argued that it would make a good introductory trainer. It returned to the civil register as F-AQMO in May 1938, operated by an aero club near Toulouse.  It survived World War II and in the 1950s, its engine uncowled, carried advertising material for a biscuit manufacturer.

F-AKFG eventually became a type D.483, though little is known about this variant.

Variants
Dewoitine D.480 Salmson 7Ac powered, as described. Registered as F-AKFF.
Dewoitine D.481  Lorraine 5Pa five cylinder radial engine with three blade propeller. Registered as F-AKFG.
Dewoitine D.482 D.480 and D.481 re-designated.
Dewoitine D.483 Second D.482 re-designated.

Specifications (D.480)

References

D.480
1930s French aircraft
Single-engined tractor aircraft
Low-wing aircraft
Aircraft first flown in 1932